Kenyatte Hassell is a Democratic politician who is currently the representative-elect for Alabama's 78th House of Representatives district, representing parts of Montgomery, Alabama.

Electoral history

References

Living people
Democratic Party members of the Alabama House of Representatives
21st-century American politicians
Year of birth missing (living people)